Mánes Bridge (Czech: Mánesův most) is a road and tramway bridge over the Vltava river in Prague, Czech Republic. It connects the Aleš Embankment and Rudolfinum to the Lesser Quarter (Malá Strana) and replaced the previous Rudolf footbridge built in 1869. The bridge is named after the Czech painter Josef Mánes.
 
The new bridge was designed by architect Mečislav Petrů and engineers František Mencl and Alois Nový. Built of concrete and supported on four segmental arches, the bridge was opened in 1914 but not fully completed until 1916. Originally named the Archduke Bridge by Archduke Franz Ferdinand of Austria, it was renamed Mánes Bridge in 1920. In the 1960s the original mosaic pavements were replaced by asphalt. However, the asphalting caused various problems, and it was removed during reconstruction work between 1992 and 1994.

References

 Jan Fischer, Ondřej Fischer: Pražské mosty. Academia, Praha 1985, s. 64–68, 105–111.
 Article contains material translated from the equivalent article (Mánesův most) on Czech Wikipedia

External links
 

Arch bridges
Bridges in Prague
Bridges completed in 1916
Bridges over the Vltava
Art Nouveau architecture in Prague
Art Nouveau bridges